The 2008 Ford Ironman World Championship was held on October 11, 2008 in Kailua-Kona, Hawaii. It was the 32nd such Ironman Triathlon World Championship, which has been held annually in Hawaii since 1978. The champions were Craig Alexander and Chrissie Wellington. The championship was organised by the World Triathlon Corporation (WTC).

Medallists

Men

Women

The championship race had a total of 1,731 athletes competing (1,256 men and 475 women) from 51 countries started the race with 1,634 finished, 94 did not finish and 3 were disqualified. A maximum temperature of 81.6 °F (27.6 °C) made for warm racing conditions with wind gusts reaching 13.0 mph (20.9 km/h).

Qualification
To enter for the 2008 World Championship race, athletes were required to qualify through performance at an Ironman or selected Ironman 70.3 race, through Hawaii residency, through a random allocation lottery, or by invitation from the WTC.

The Ironman 2008 Series consisted of 21 Ironman qualifying races plus the Ironman World Championship 2008 which was itself a qualifier for the 2009 Ironman World Championship. The series started with Ironman Wisconsin 2007 held on September 9, 2007, and in total 1,800 athletes qualified for the World Championship race.

Qualifying Ironmans 

There were 33,769 recorded Ironman finishing times during the 2008 series, with the fastest time of 7:59:55 set by Chris McCormack in the Ironman European Championship 2008.

2008 Ironman Series results

Men

Women

References

External links
Kona 2008 — IRONMAN.com

Ironman World Championship
Ironman
Sports competitions in Hawaii
2008 in sports in Hawaii
Triathlon competitions in the United States